Pimba is a small settlement lying on the transcontinental railway line in the Australian state of South Australia. It lies at the junction of the Stuart Highway to Alice Springs and the road to Woomera, Roxby Downs and Andamooka. There is an iconic roadhouse, named "Spud's Roadhouse", which sells fuel and general shop items and meals and has accommodation.

Pimba was originally established as a construction camp for the transcontinental railway in the early 20th century and was retained as a railway siding.  It is reported as being surveyed as a township during the 1960s and was gazetted as a locality in August 2004 under the Geographical Names Act 1991 with creation of boundaries along with the retention of the "long established name".

Great Southern Rail's Indian Pacific (running between Sydney and Perth) and The Ghan (running between Adelaide, Alice Springs and Darwin, trains still pass Pimba Siding but do not stop; both trains pass the town twice a week in each direction.

Pimba is located within the federal division of Grey, the state electoral district of Giles and the Pastoral Unincorporated Area of South Australia. As of 2016, the community within Pimba received municipal services from a South Australian agency, the Outback Communities Authority.

References

Trans-Australian Railway
Far North (South Australia)
Places in the unincorporated areas of South Australia